Keith Lloyd is the Dean and Head of Swansea University Medical School. He is the Chair of the Welsh Psychiatric Society and of the Royal College of Psychiatrists in Wales and Vice President of the Royal College of Psychiatrists. Professor Lloyd is also the trustee for Wales of the charity Samaritans UK.

Education and early career 

Lloyd qualified in medicine from Guy's Hospital Medical School. He later studied at the London School of Economics, trained in psychiatry at the Bethlem Royal Hospital and Maudsley Hospitals and then undertook doctoral research at the Institute of Psychiatry London. He was subsequently appointed as consultant psychiatrist in Exeter UK.

Professional roles 

Along with his position as Dean of Swansea University Medical School, Lloyd is an Honorary Consultant Psychiatrist, in the NHS in Swansea. He has also held the position of Professor of Psychiatry at Swansea University Medical School since 2004.

Awards and honours 

Fellow Learned Society of Wales

Fellow Royal College of Physicians of Edinburgh

Guest Professor at Huazhong University of Science and Technology, Wuhan

Other activities 

Lloyd is a member of the professional reference panel for the mental health charity HAFAL. He chairs the board of Swansea's Volcano Theatre.

References

Living people
20th-century Welsh medical doctors
21st-century Welsh medical doctors
Year of birth missing (living people)